Gerald Cleaver may refer to:

Gerald Cleaver (musician) (born 1963), American jazz drummer
Gerald B. Cleaver, American physicist